Orange Sun  may refer to:
 Orange Sun (song), a song by Shonen Knife
 a sunflower variety 
 The orange sun, a 1965 novel by Romanian writer Camillo Baciu
 An orange giant or orange dwarf; a couple types of stars